Brown's Mountain is a mountain in Cherokee County in the state of South Carolina, United States. The mountain is one of the three main mountain summits of Kings Mountain National Military Park and is the highest in the park. The other mountain summits are Joes Mountain and Kings Mountain.

External links 
 Brown's Mountain Summit - South Carolina Mountain Peak Information

Mountains of South Carolina
Landforms of Cherokee County, South Carolina
Inselbergs of Piedmont (United States)